This is a list of punk rock compilation albums. Compilation albums played a particularly vital role in the development of new punk rock bands, since relatively few local bands had a large enough audience to justify their own albums.

Multiple-band albums

United States

United Kingdom

Single-band albums

The Clash

 5 Album Studio Set
 1977 Revisited
 The Clash Hits Back
 Clash on Broadway
 The Essential Clash
 Singles Box
 The Singles (1991 The Clash album)
 The Singles (2007 The Clash album)
 Sound System (album)
 The Story of the Clash, Volume 1
 Super Black Market Clash

The Cramps
 ...Off the Bone

Germs
 What We Do Is Secret (EP)

Ramones

 All the Stuff (And More) Volume One 
 All the Stuff (And More) Volume Two 
 Best of the Chrysalis Years 
 The Best of the Ramones 
 The Chrysalis Years 
 Essential (Ramones album) 
 Greatest Hits (Ramones album) 
 Hey! Ho! Let's Go: The Anthology 
 Lifestyles of the Ramones 
 Loud, Fast Ramones: Their Toughest Hits 
 Masters of Rock: Ramones 
  Weird Tales of the Ramones

The Reverend Horton Heat
 20th Century Masters – The Millennium Collection: The Best of The Reverend Horton Heat

The Saints
 The Greatest Cowboy Movie Never Made
 Know Your Product: The Best of The Saints

By punk rock subgenre

Garage punk
 Hell on Earth: A Tribute to the Misfits

Protopunk
 A-Square (Of Course): The Story of Michigan's Legendary A-Square Records 
 Green Crystal Ties, Volume 7: Mind-Expanding Punk of the 60s 
 No Thanks! The '70s Punk Rebellion 
 Nuggets: Original Artyfacts from the First Psychedelic Era, 1965–1968 
 SEX: Too Fast to Live Too Young to Die

Punk jazz

John Zorn compilation albums

 Black Box (Naked City album)
 The Classic Guide to Strategy
 Filmworks 1986–1990
 Godard/Spillane
 Naked City: The Complete Studio Recordings
 Painkiller: The Collected Works
 The Parachute Years
 Torture Garden (album)

Ska punk

NOFX compilation albums
 45 or 46 Songs That Weren't Good Enough to Go on Our Other Records
 The Greatest Songs Ever Written (By Us)
 The Longest EP
 Maximum Rocknroll (album)

See also

 Lists of albums
 Mystic Records, a label specializing in compilation albums
 Punk rock subgenres

References

Punk compilation
Punk rock compilation albums
Punk rock